Toiduklubi (The Food Club) is the second Dagö album, released in 2002.

Track listing
 Presentatsioon (Presentation)
 Toiduklubi (The Food Club)
 Päris taga lõpus (Far At The End)
 Üks hetk päevast jäi puudu (One Moment Was Want Of The Day)
 Jää (Ice)
 Kalamaja moonid (Kalamaja Poppies)
 Hobiaedniku laul (The Suburb Hobby Gardener's Song)
 Tartu tenniseklubi (In A Tartu Tennis Club)
 Noorte inimeste laul (The Young People's Song)
 Püüa pilvi, sa ulatud nendeni (Catch The Clouds - You Can Reach Them)
 Pulmad (The Wedding)

References
Dagö's Official Website

2002 albums
Dagö albums